Evolution: The Origin of Species is a card game created by Dmitriy Knorre and Sergey Machin in 2010. The game is inspired by the evolutionary biology.   It was published by SIA Rightgames RBG.   English, French and German game editions were published in 2011.
Two or more players create their own animals, make them evolve and hunt in order to survive. 

In 2014, North Star Games published game Evolution. The original authors were part of the design crew.

Rules

Place definition in match 
The player with the largest number of victory points at the end of the game is the winner.
The rankings of players in match are determined as follows:

Preparation 
The deck is shuffled. Then each player gets 6 cards from the top of the deck to their hands. They roll dice to determine the first player.

The game turn structure 
Each turn of the game consists of four phases:

During each phase players act in order moving clockwise. The player who can't or doesn't want to act passes. Each phase ends when  nobody can or want to act.

Development phase 
This phase consists of several rounds. During the phase players can play their cards by putting them from their hands onto the table. Each player may play each card either as an animal or as a trait of an existing animal. If card is played as a trait, it is put underneath the corresponding animal. Some cards have two traits, but only one trait can be used - the chosen one. No animal can have two identical traits except "fat tissue" trait. Pairwise traits (i.e. "communication") are played only onto a pair of animals. Such cards are placed between the two cards onto which they are played. No duplet of animals can have two identical pairwise traits. However an animal can have several different pairwise traits with another animal.

Food bank determination phase 
The amount of food available during this turn is determined at this time. Food bank estimated this way:

Using two game sets or one game set with first expansion:

Using two game sets:

The first player rolls the dice. Then the corresponding number of red tokens is put in the center of the table. That is a food bank for current turn.

Feeding phase 

Feeding phase consist of several rounds. During this phase players in order take one red food token from the food bank and put it on the top of one of their animals. Player can take more than one food token if an animal has specified traits i.e. "communication". Some traits allow to get blue "extra food" tokens i.e. "piracy", "cooperation".  

Animal needs 1 food token to be def without additional food requirements. Trait that increased food requirement have corresponding number on the top left corner of a card. 

Animal with "carnivorous" trait can attack another animal of any player, attacker's owner as well. In this case player doesn't take food token from food bank. Instead, "carnivorous" animal gets 2 blue food tokens if attack was successful. Eaten animal, all traits including pairwise traits associated with it are put into corresponding players's discard piles. "Carnivorous" animal can attack only once during feeding phase. It cannot attack if it has already fed and hasn't empty "fat tissue".

There is plenty of traits defending animal from carnivorous. For example, "camouflage" defends animal from attack if attacker has't "sharp vision". "Tail loss" allow animal to survive during carnivorous attack via discarding any defender animal's trait.
The carnivorous gets only one blue food token. Thus defender animal can escape from negative traits such as "parasite".

Feeding phase ends when no player can\want play traits or all animals fed and filled up their "fat tissues". Any remaining red tokens in the food bank are set aside.

Extinction and draw phase 
At the beginning of this phase all animals which are not fully fed are put into corresponding player's discard piles, along with their traits, and all the pairwise traits associated with them. Each player has its own discard pile. The cards are put into a discard pile with lizard face facing up. Players can look at cards in their own discard pile but not ones in piles of other players.

Then the first player deals new cards : one at a time in order, beginning from the first player. Each player gets in total the following number of cards: 1 + the number of survived animals belonging to the player.  If player hasn't any animals and cards in his hand then they take 6 cards from the deck during this phase.  If the deck is empty it's possible that one or more players get fewer cards then they are due. 

After that all food tokens except fat tokens are removed from the cards and set aside. The new turn stars with the development phase; the role of first player passes clockwise from the first player of previous turn.

End of the game 
After the deck is empty the last turn begins. After the extinction phase of the last turn the victory points are counted. Each player is awarded victory points as follows:

Rule treatment 
Since there is a variety of possible game cases , many arguable points can appear while treating the rules. Most of issues are solved after looking the rules more closely. Also there is official FAQ with answers the most popular questions. Several rules were changed or elaborated in the next editions and after expansions were published.

Expansions
Evolution has several expansion packs.

Full Expansions

Evolution: Time to Fly 

Evolution: Time to Fly - first official expansion published in 2011 in Russian language and then published in English, French , German, Italian, Polish, Czech, Slovakian, Ukrainian languages. New traits were added.

Evolution: Contintents 

Evolution: Continents - second official expansion published in 2012. New traits and rules were added: an animal  now dwell in one of 3 different locations. Each location has its own unique food bank . Food bank depends on number of players.

Evolution. Plantarium  

Evolution: Plantarium - third official expansion published in 2016.  
New entities, traits, and rules where added:
 Plants - new entity to generate food.  Plants can grow: the number of red food left on a plant determine the number of plant in next development phase. Thus an element of randomness disappeared in food aspect. 
 Food bank determination phase is skipped in the game with Plantarium expansion.
 Plant trait. Player can put plant trait on a plant to make the plant suitable to player's animals or unsuitable to opponents' animals
 In setup the first player deals 8 cards to each player.
 Some traits from other expansions have changes in their rules in order to be appropriate with new features.

Mini Expansions

Evolution: Variation 

Evolution: Variation Mini-Expansion published in 2012 as a part of gift set and republished stand-alone in 2015. It consists of 18 additional cards delivered in gift set. Gift set includes the basic set and expansions: Time To Fly, Continents. Also mini-expansion has additional cards for game Evolution: Random Mutations.

Game scenarios

"Evolution. Fatality"  scenario 

In this scenario the game consists of a single turn. All cards from the deck is divided equally between players. Extraneous cards are removed from the game. Food bank determinations phase begins before development phase.

Preparation 
They determine the first player randomly. Then the deck is shuffled up and all the cards are dealt to players equally. 

Base deck of the game is suitable for this scenario. It can be expanded by cards from 
expansions.
From Time to Fly expansion:

From Continents expansion:

In this case, the first player shuffles the deck and hand out 20 cards to each player. Then he removes the remaining cards from the game face down.

The game turn structure

Food bank determination phase 
Food bank is estimated this way:
 sum of 2 dice + number of players

Development phase 
Players can't pass and must play all their cards.

Feeding phase 
Players can't activate "hibernation ability"

Extinction phase 
After this phase players count the victory and discard points as usual and determine the winner.

"Evolution. Equilibrium" scenario 

In this scenario  all the players have equal conditions. Players get the same set of traits and opportunity to choose required one in current game position.  1 "Evolution" base set is required  for 2-4 players. 2 "Evolution" base sets -  for 5-8 players.

Preparation 
Each player get its own "genofond" of 21 cards (2 "swimming" cards  and by 1 card of rest 19 traits). Then player choose 6 cart from his "genofond" to his hand. That is start hand for him.  The rest cards are put as a ream with lizard face-up.

Base deck of the game is suitable for this scenario. It can be expanded by cards from 
expansions.
From Time to Fly expansion:

The game turn structure

Food bank determination phase 
Food bank is estimated as in basic set rules.

Development phase 
Each player has to play at least 1 card (as an animal or trait).

Feeding phase 
This phase proceeds by basic set rules.

Extinction phase 
At the end of extinction phase for each player it is determined, as in basic set rules, the quantity of cards to get (1 card per 1 survived animal + 1 card, if there is no survived animal and no cards in hand – player takes 6 cards). Player looks at his "genofond" and takes cards from it for the next turn. If there is no player who can take accrued cards in full, then the last turn begins.

Awards
 2014: Imagination Gaming Family & Education Awards 2014 Cross-Curriculim Bronze Award
 2013: Nürnberg ToyAward nominee in Teenager&Family (11+ years) category

References

External links
 Game makers' web page
 Review – Evolution: The Origin of Species from RightGames
 Evolution: The Origin of Species
 Evolution: The Origin of Species on BoardGameGeek.com
 Evolution: Time to Fly on BoardGameGeek.com
 Evolution: Continents on BoardGameGeek.com
 Evolution: Plantarium on BoardGameGeek.com
 Evolution: Variation on BoardGameGeek.com
 Board game designers online store

Card games introduced in 2010
Evolution in popular culture
Biology-themed board games